A list of League of Ireland top scorers.

A Division

Notes

Premier Division

First Division

Notes

All–Time

Notes

References

 
Top
Ireland
Ireland
Association football player non-biographical articles